Pseudeulia is a genus of moths belonging to the subfamily Tortricinae of the family Tortricidae. It contains only one species, Pseudeulia asinana, which is found in Italy, Slovenia, Austria, the Czech Republic, Slovakia, Hungary, Romania, Bulgaria, North Macedonia and Ukraine.

The wingspan is 23–28 mm. Adults are on wing from April to May in one generation per year.

The larvae feed on Laurus nobilis and Pyrus species.

See also
List of Tortricidae genera

References

External links
tortricidae.com

Archipini
Monotypic moth genera
Moths of Europe
Tortricidae genera